Bellot Strait is a strait in Nunavut that separates Somerset Island to its north from the Murchison Promontory of Boothia Peninsula to its south, which is the northernmost part of the mainland of the Americas. The  and  strait connects the Gulf of Boothia, Prince Regent Inlet, and Brentford Bay to its east with Peel Sound and Franklin Strait to its west.

Geography

It is also often filled with small icebergs which pose a danger to ships in the strait.

History

The first Europeans to see the strait were the Canadian explorer  William Kennedy and the French naval officer Joseph René Bellot, who reached it by dogsled from Batty Bay in 1852. This proved that Somerset was an island and that Prince Regent Inlet had a difficult westward exit.

In 1858, Francis Leopold McClintock tried to pass the strait but had to abandon the attempt. The strait was first crossed from west to east by the Hudson's Bay Company ship Aklavik in 1937, piloted by Scotty Gall. Henry Larsen crossed it in 1942 on the first west-east transit of the Northwest Passage.

The Fort Ross trading post on the northern shore was established in 1937, and lasted for 11 years. However, the building has been refurbished and strengthened, and acts as a refuge for researchers and crews of small boats passing through.

Sources

 The Canadian Encyclopedia 
 The Columbia Gazetteer of North America
 Bellot Strait conditions – Ross Weld

Bibliography

External links 

Straits of Kitikmeot Region
Straits of Qikiqtaaluk Region